Oliver Stang (born 26 June 1988 in Bad Bergzabern) is a retired German footballer who was a defender and last played for SV Elversberg in the Regionalliga Südwest.

Stang made 24 appearances in the 2. Bundesliga as well as a further 20 3. Liga games during his playing career before his transfer in 2011 to SV Eintracht Trier 05 in the Regionalliga West.

References

External links 
 

1988 births
Living people
People from Bad Bergzabern
German footballers
Association football defenders
2. Bundesliga players
3. Liga players
Regionalliga players
Borussia Mönchengladbach II players
VfL Osnabrück players
SV Eintracht Trier 05 players
Footballers from Rhineland-Palatinate